Robert C. Hermann (April 28, 1931 – February 10, 2020) was an American mathematician and mathematical physicist.  In the 1960s Hermann worked on elementary particle physics and quantum field theory, and published books which revealed the interconnections between vector bundles on Riemannian manifolds and gauge theory in physics, before these interconnections became "common knowledge" among physicists in the 1970s.

Biography
Born in Brooklyn, Hermann studied in Paris and at Princeton University, where he attended lectures by Charles Ehresmann and where in 1955 under Donald Spencer he received his PhD with thesis The Differential geometry of homogeneous spaces. He taught at Rutgers University, which he left in 1975 and then did research primarily with financial support from the Ames Research Center of NASA. In the academic year 1969/1970 he was at the Institute for Advanced Study.

Following the French school of Élie Cartan, Hermann published numerous books on differential geometry and Lie group theory and their applications to differential equations, integrable systems, control theory, and physics. Most of these books were published in Brookline, Massachusetts by the Mathematical Science Press, which Hermann himself founded. He also worked on the history of differential geometry and Lie group theory and edited, with extensive new commentary, the work of Sophus Lie, Gregorio Ricci-Curbastro and Tullio Levi-Civita, Felix Klein's Vorlesungen über Mathematikgeschichte, Élie Cartan, Georges Valiron and the contributions to invariant theory by David Hilbert.

Robert Hermann died on February 10, 2020.

Books 
 Lie groups for physicists, Benjamin 1966
 Fourier analysis on groups and partial wave analysis, Benjamin 1969
 Lie algebras and quantum mechanics, Benjamin 1970
 Lectures in mathematical physics, Benjamin 1970
 Vector Bundles in mathematical physics, Benjamin 1970
 Geometry, Physics and Systems, Dekker 1973
 Differential geometry and the calculus of variations, Academic Press 1968, 2nd edn, Brookline 1977
 Differential geometric methods and ideas in physics and engineering, Rutgers University Press, 1973
 Physical Aspects of Lie group theory, Montreal, Presse Universitaire de Montreal, 1974

In the Mathematical Science Press, Brookline, Massachusetts:
 Topics in the mathematics of quantum mechanics, Brookline, 1973, 1977
 with Clyde Martin: Algebro-geometric and Lie theoretic techniques in systems theory, Brookline 1977
 Algebraic topics in systems theory, Brookline 1973
 General algebraic ideas, Brookline 1973
 Topics in General Relativity, Brookline 1973
 Energy-Momentum Tensors, Brookline 1973
 Cartanian geometry, nonlinear waves, and control theory, Brookline, 2 parts: Part A 1979, Part B 1980 (Cartanian meant in the sense of Élie Cartan)
 Geometric structure theory of systems-control theory and physics, Brookline 1974
 Constrained mechanics and Lie theory, Brookline 1992
 Topics in the geometric theory of linear systems, Brookline 1984
 Yang–Mills, Kaluza–Klein, and the Einstein program, Brookline 1978 (with contributions by Frank Estabrook, Hugo Wahlquist)
 Topics in the geometric theory of integrable dynamical systems, Brookline 1984
 Linear and tensor algebra, Brookline 1973
 Gauge fields and Cartan–Ehresmann Connections, Brookline 1975
 Topics in physical geometry, Brookline 1988
 with Norman Hurt: Quantum statistical mechanics and Lie group harmonic analysis, Brookline 1980
 Toda lattices, cosymplectic manifolds, Bäcklund transformations, and kinks, Brookline 1977
 The geometry of non-linear differential equations, Bäcklund transformations, and solitons, Brookline 1977
 Geometric structures in nonlinear systems, Brookline 1991 (including hydrodynamics, deformation structures, with list of publications by Hermann to 1991)
 Spinors, Clifford and Cayley Algebras, Brookline 1974
 Linear systems and introductory algebraic geometry, Brookline 1974
 Lie–Cartan–Ehresmann Theory, Brookline 1993
 Lie-theoretic ordinary differential equations, numerical analysis, mechanics, and differential systems, Brooklyn 1994
 C–O–R generalized functions, current algebras and control, Brookline 1994
 Geometric computing science – first steps, Brookline 1991
 Quantum and fermion differential geometry, Brookline 1977

References

External links 
 Books from Mathematical Science Press
 

20th-century American mathematicians
21st-century American mathematicians
20th-century American physicists
1931 births
2020 deaths
American textbook writers
American historians of mathematics